NGC 6263 is an elliptical galaxy in the constellation Hercules. It was discovered by Albert Marth on June 28, 1864.

References

External links
 Simbad
 Image NGC 6263

6263
10618
59292
+05-40-008
Hercules (constellation)
Elliptical galaxies